
Gmina Kobyla Góra is a rural gmina (administrative district) in Ostrzeszów County, Greater Poland Voivodeship, in west-central Poland.

Villages
Gmina Kobyla Góra contains the villages and settlements of Bałdowice, Bierzów, Ignaców, Kobyla Góra, Kuźnica Myślniewska, Ligota, Mąkoszyce, Marcinki, Mostki, Myślniew, Parzynów, Pisarzowice, Rybin, Zmyślona Ligocka and Zmyślona Parzynowska.

Neighbouring gminas
Gmina Kobyla Góra is bordered by the gminas of Bralin, Kępno, Międzybórz, Ostrzeszów, Perzów, Sośnie and Syców.

References
Polish official population figures 2006

Kobyla Gora
Ostrzeszów County